Edgell is both a surname and a given name. Notable people with the name include:

Surname
Beatrice Edgell (1871–1948), British psychologist 
John Augustine Edgell (1880-1962), Royal Navy Officer and Hydrographer of the Navy
Larry J. Edgell (born 1946), American politician
Zee Edgell (born in 1940), American writer
 Robert Gordon Edgell (1866–1948)

Given name
Edgell Rickword (poet, critic, journalist) (1898–1982)

Places
Edgell Island, Nunavut, Canada

Company
 A brand of frozen vegetable and food products owned by  Simplot
 See also Edgell, as in Edge detection